Heitz is a German surname. Notable people with the surname include:

Arsène Heitz (1908–1989), French draughtsman and co-author of the Flag of Europe
Emil Heitz (1892–1965), German-Swiss botanist and geneticist
Kenny Heitz (1947–2012), American basketball player
Madeleine Heitz (born 1940), Swiss fencer
Markus Heitz (born 1971), German writer
Walter Heitz (1878–1944), German Wehrmacht general

See also
Heitz Wine Cellars, American winery

German-language surnames